Manu Snellinx (23 August 1948 – 29 May 2017) was a Belgian cyclist. He competed in the sprint and tandem events at the 1972 Summer Olympics.

References

External links
 

1948 births
2017 deaths
Belgian male cyclists
Olympic cyclists of Belgium
Cyclists at the 1972 Summer Olympics
Cyclists from Limburg (Belgium)
People from Bilzen